Monilinia rubi is a species of fungi in the family Sclerotiniaceae. The species is a plant pathogen causing "dry berry disease" of caneberries. The species was formerly known by the invalidly published name Rhizoctonia rubi.

References

Fungal plant pathogens and diseases
Small fruit diseases
Sclerotiniaceae
Fungi described in 2022